Amir Khalaila (born 21 March 1997) is an Israeli footballer who plays as a striker.

References

External links
 
 

1997 births
Living people
People from Sakhnin
Arab citizens of Israel
Arab-Israeli footballers
Israeli footballers
Bnei Sakhnin F.C. players
Hapoel Be'er Sheva F.C. players
Hapoel Ramat Gan F.C. players
Hapoel Acre F.C. players
Hapoel Iksal F.C. players
Hapoel Bnei Lod F.C. players
Hapoel Kaukab F.C. players
Bnei Yehuda Tel Aviv F.C. players
Hapoel Rishon LeZion F.C. players
F.C. Dimona players
Israeli Premier League players
Liga Leumit players
Footballers from Sakhnin
Association football forwards